The McLaren M24 was a race car designed and built by McLaren between 1977 and 1979 for Indy car racing.

References

External links

Indianapolis 500
American Championship racing cars